King and Emperor is the third (and concluding) novel in the Hammer and the Cross series. It was written by Harry Harrison and first published in 1996 by Tor Books.

Plot summary
Shef, now "King of the North", sets out to learn the secrets of manned flight and Greek fire while his enemy, the now emperor Bruno, seeks the Holy Grail.

References
Harrison, Harry. King and Emperor. Tor Books, 1996.

1996 British novels
British alternative history novels
Irish alternative history novels
Fictional Vikings
Novels by Harry Harrison
Norse mythology in popular culture
Novels set in the Viking Age
The Hammer and the Cross series
Novels set in Europe
Tor Books books